Energoprojekt holding (full legal name: Energoprojekt holding a.d. Beograd) is a Serbian construction company with headquarters in Belgrade, Serbia. Founded in 1951, it enters into the composition of BELEX15 and BELEXline, the two main indices of the Belgrade Stock Exchange.

History
Energoprojekt holding was founded on 11 July 1951. Originally conceived as a consulting company, it has gradually diversified its activities and today it has numerous subsidiaries and joint ventures in Serbia and abroad. Energoprojekt holding was admitted to the regulated market of the Belgrade Stock Exchange 18 July 2007.

In July 2017, after months of negotiations, Napred Razvoj, a Serbian construction company, became the majority stakeholder of the company. In November 2017, a new majority shareholder Napred razvoj has decided to sell insurance subsidiary Energoprojekt Garant to the Slovenian insurance company Sava Osiguranje.

Activities
Energoprojekt holding is a worldwide company based in Serbia and develops activities in the fields of energy, industry, architecture, infrastructure, environment and information technologies, it operates through its subsidiaries Energoprojekt Hidroinženjering (engineering, hydropower, water supply systems and irrigation), Energoprojekt Urbanizam i arhitektura (building, engineering and construction), Energoprojekt Entel (engineering, energy, power plants, transmission and distribution of electricity), Energoprojekt Industrija (engineering, industrial plants and facilities), Energoprojekt Visokogradnja (building, engineering and construction, civil engineering, industrial and energy installations), Energoprojekt Niskogradnja (construction, various facilities in infrastructure), Energoprojekt Oprema (constructions in the areas of energy, of water management and industry), Energoprojekt Energodata (Information Technology) and Energoprojekt Garant (insurance).

Locations and operational activities
Aside from Serbia, Energoprojekt holding is represented in:
 South America, in Peru
 Africa, directly or through subsidiaries in Algeria, Guinea, Ghana, Nigeria, Uganda, Zambia and Zimbabwe
 Middle East, in Jordan, Iraq, Qatar, Abu Dhabi, Dubai and the Sultanate of Oman
 Asia, in Kazakhstan
 Europe, in the United Kingdom, Germany, Montenegro, Cyprus and Russia.

Achievements
Among the projects undertaken by Energoprojekt holding include plant Iron Gate I Hydroelectric Power Station, near Kladovo (designed jointly with the Institute of Hydroelectrical Researches in Bucharest, Romania between 1956 and 1960) and the dam and power plant Bajina Bašta. The company has also built power plants of Obrenovac and Obilić, while outside of Serbia it has conducted two power plants in Qatar. In Belgrade, in the field of architecture, it has built Belgrade Arena, the Hotel Hyatt Regency Belgrade, a mansion for Robert Mugabe in Harare and others.

Hydropower plants in Serbia

Buildings in Serbia

Market data
As of 8 March 2019, Energoprojekt holding has a market capitalization of €58.33 million.

References

External links
 
 Energoprojekt Hidroinženjering
 Energoprojekt Urbanizam i arhitektura
 Energoprojekt Entel
 Energoprojekt Industrija
 Energoprojekt Visokogradnja
 Energoprojekt Niskogradnja
 Energoprojekt Oprema
 Energoprojekt Energodata
 How a Yugoslav Company Built an International Market. The New York Times. John Tagliabue. March 28, 1983, Section D, Page 3.

1951 establishments in Serbia
2017 mergers and acquisitions
Companies based in Belgrade
Construction and civil engineering companies of Serbia
Holding companies established in 1951
Holding companies of Serbia
Construction and civil engineering companies established in 1951